Green week, or the green holidays, is a traditional Slavic seasonal festival celebrated in early June. It is closely linked with the cult of the dead and the spring agricultural rites. In Eastern European villages, the seven weeks following Easter have historically been a time of festivity. Green week takes place during the seventh week leading up to the Pentecost, and includes the seventh Thursday after Easter, called Semik.

The green week is followed by Trinity week, also known as the holiday of the Trinity in Eastern Christianity. It is also widely known as Whitsuntide week in the English-speaking world, especially Great Britain, and is inaugurated by the celebrations of Trinity Sunday, the Sunday of Pentecost in Eastern Christianity.

Observance 

On Semik (the Thursday of the green week), funeral rites are held for the unclean dead (those who had died before their time). Birch trees are particularly significant, because they are considered hosts for the souls of the deceased. Sometimes people honor a particular tree by decorating it or carrying it around. At other times, people cut birch branches and hang them in their homes. The birch is also seen as a symbol of vegetative power, and may be honored with people's hope that it will bring its vitality to the coming season's crops.

Springtime and fertility rituals are also important to the holiday. Girls bring offerings of fried eggs (a symbol of rebirth) and beer to birches, and speak charms about improved harvest when weaving garlands for the trees. Another tradition is for girls to pledge vows of friendship before the chosen birch tree. Some believe this to be the remnant of ritual sexual activity associated with the cult of spring. Like Kostroma during Maslenitsa, a chosen birch tree is destroyed at the end of the festivities. It is usually drowned, "in order to provide the needed rainfall for the sprouting crops".

Association with rusalki 

The rusalki are nature spirits (navki, mavki) associated with green week traditions. They derived their name from Rusalii, another name for the holidays. Some believe they were associated with deceased family members, or perhaps only unclean dead. Sometimes an honored birch tree would be named for a rusalka as part of green week. Some of the rites of green week (like making offerings of eggs and garlands) were thought to placate the rusalki so they would stay away from the village's agricultural fields for the season and not bring them harm. The rusalki are also associated with water and fertility, and so may be invoked during green week in an attempt to bring their moisture and vigor to the fields. During green week, rusalki are believed to be more active, making them a greater threat to villagers. One precaution villagers take during this week is to avoid swimming, because rusalki are thought to live in the water and could drown passersby.

Related observances 

There is a similar holiday celebrating Pentecost in Romania, called Rusalii. There are also similar Germanic traditions, for example, Pfingstbaumpflanzen in Germany. In modern-day Poland it is celebrated along with Pentecost Sunday as Zielone Świątki.

See also 
 Călușari

References

External links 

 Holy Trinity Day or Svyata Triytsya and Green Holidays in Ukraine 

Slavic customs
Slavic holidays
Folk calendar of the East Slavs
Pentecost
Observances in Belarus
Observances in Bulgaria
Observances in Russia
Observances in Poland
Observances in Ukraine
Belarusian traditions
Bulgarian traditions
Czech traditions
Polish traditions
Russian folklore
Ukrainian traditions
June observances
Summer events in Ukraine